The Dalhousie Law Journal is a peer-reviewed academic journal of law published by the Schulich School of Law (formerly Dalhousie Law School) at Dalhousie University in Halifax, Nova Scotia, Canada. The journal was established in 1973 by Dean Ronald St. John Macdonald and covers contemporary legal issues.

Indexing
The journal is indexed and abstracted in the following bibliographic databases:
CanLII
HeinOnline
Index to Legal Periodicals
LexisNexis

External links
 

Canadian law journals
Dalhousie University
Publications established in 1973
English-language journals
Biannual journals